Lene Lai (born 6 June 1989) is a Taiwanese actress and model. She was the 2nd runner-up of the Miss Asia Pageant 2008.

Life and career
Lai studied at Tainan University of Technology, but she has since put her study on hold. She participated in numerous television programs including Everybody Speaks Nonsenses II - Hot Pot. She is a seasoned car show model and has played small roles in many television series such as My Queen and Bull Fighting.

Lai became the second Taiwanese to win a title from the Miss Asia Pageant. After winning the pageant, she was signed by Asia Television as an actress in 2009.

Lai is married to singer and actor Nylon Chen.

Filmography

Film
(Sex) Appeal (2014)
The Regret (2013)
Comedy Makes You Cry  (2010)
Invitation Only  (2009)

Television

Gamer’s Generation (2016)
Refresh Man (2016)
Love Cheque Charge  (2014)
Pleasantly Surprised (2014)
King Flower (2013)
 Spring Love (2013)
Ti Amo Chocolate (2012)
Absolute Darling (2012)
Love Keeps Going (2011)
4 Gifts (2010)
My Queen (2009)
Bull Fighting (2007)
Summer x Summer (2007)

References

External links

 
Lene Lai at chinesemov.com

21st-century Taiwanese actresses
Taiwanese film actresses
Taiwanese female models
Living people
1989 births
Taiwanese television actresses
Actresses from Taipei